Two Girls and a Sailor is a 1944 American musical film directed by Richard Thorpe and starring Van Johnson, June Allyson and Gloria DeHaven. Set on the American homefront during World War II, it's about two singing sisters who create a lavish canteen to entertain members of the military, thanks to financial contributions from a mysterious donor. The picture features a host of celebrity performances, including Jimmy Durante doing his hallmark "Inka Dinka Doo", Gracie Allen (in her final film role), and Lena Horne. Richard Connell and Gladys Lehman were nominated for the Academy Award for Best Original Screenplay.

Plot
Two sisters, Jean and Patsy Deyo, are born into a vaudeville family, and when they grow up, start an act themselves. One night, they invite a bunch of servicemen to their apartment. They are both attracted to a sailor named Johnny. Jean points out to Johnny an unused nearby warehouse they wish they could make into a canteen to entertain the troops.

An anonymous benefactor they call "Somebody" starts fulfilling that goal. First, a Mr. Nizby shows up and hands them the keys to the warehouse, announcing they now own it. As the two sisters explore the dusty building, they discover that Billy Kipp, an old vaudeville performer they knew as kids, has been squatting there ever since his wife left him and took their infant son many years ago. A horde of cleaners tidies up, and the place is made into an inviting canteen, all courtesy of "Somebody". Famous entertainers perform, as do Jean and Patsy.

Johnny starts dating Jean, unaware that Patsy is also in love with him. Meanwhile, Patsy tries to discover who "Somebody" is. Finally, she learns that he is none other than Johnny. Also, Johnny turns out to be in love with Patsy, and Jean with Sergeant Frank Miller, but both did not want to hurt the other. Everything gets straightened out in the end. To top it off, Billy spots a sailor who looks just like a younger version of himself, down to his nose. His son and he are joyfully reunited.

Cast

Soundtrack
 Overture
 Did You Ever Have the Feeling That You Wanted to Go? - Written and performed by Jimmy Durante
 Who Will Be with You When I'm Far Away - Performed, words, music by Jimmy Durante
 Sweet and Lovely - words music by Gus Arnheim, Harry Tobias, Jules Lemare - Performed by June Allyson (dubbed by Virginia Rees) and Gloria DeHaven (dubbed by Dorothy Jackson)
 A-Tisket, A-Tasket - words music by Al Feldman and Ella Fitzgerald - Performed by June Allyson and Gloria DeHaven
 Charmaine - by Erno Rapee and Lew Pollack - Performed by Harry James and His Music Makers
 A Love Like Ours - words by Mann Holiner, music by Alberta Nichols - Performed by June Allyson (dubbed by Virginia Rees) and Gloria DeHaven, with Harry James and His Music Makers
 Rumba Rumba - words by Sammy Gallop, music by José Pafumy - Performed by Lina Romay with Xavier Cugat and His Orchestra
 Granada - words music by Agustín Lara  - Performed by Carlos Ramírez, with Xavier Cugat and His Orchestra
 Bim, Bam, Bum - Performed by Xavier Cugat and His Orchestra
 My Mother Told Me - Sung by Gloria DeHaven; later reprised by Van Johnson, Tom Drake and Frank Sully
 Estrellita - music by M. M. Ponce - Performed by Harry James and His Music Makers
 Take It Easy - words music by Al DeBru, Irving Taylor, Vic Mizzy  - Performed by Virginia O'Brien, Lee Wilde, Lyn Wilde, and Lina Romay with Xavier Cugat and His Orchestra
 Thrill of a New Romance - Played by Xavier Cugat and His Orchestra. Danced by Ben Blue and Lina Romay
 Concerto for Index Finger - Performed on piano by Gracie Allen with orchestra, conducted by Albert Coates
 In A Moment of Madness - words by Ralph Freed, music by Jimmy McHugh - Sung by Helen Forrest, accompanied by Harry James and His Music Makers
 Flash - by Harry James
 The Young Man with a Horn - words by Ralph Freed, music by Georgie Stoll - Performed by June Allyson and Harry James and His Music Makers
 Anchors Aweigh - Performed by an unidentified marching band in the dream sequence
 You, Dear - words by Ralph Freed, music by Sammy Fain  - Performed by Harry James and His Music Makers
 Babalú - words music by Margarita Lecuona - Performed by Lina Romay with Xavier Cugat and His Orchestra
 Inka Dinka Doo - words music by Jimmy Durante, Ben Ryan, Harry Donnelly - Performed by Jimmy Durante
 Ritual Fire Dance - by Manuel de Falla - Performed on pianos by José Iturbi and Amparo Iturbi
 Paper Doll - words music by Johnny S. Black - Performed by Lena Horne
 Medley (A Love Like Ours, The Young Man with a Horn, Sweet and Lovely) - Performed by Allyson, DeHaven with Harry James and His Music Makers
Source: IMDB

Reception
According to MGM records, the film earned $2,852,000 in the US and Canada and $1,724,000 elsewhere, resulting in a profit of $1,726,000.

The film is recognized by American Film Institute in these lists:
 2004: AFI's 100 Years...100 Songs:	
 "Inka Dinka Doo" – Nominated

References
Notes

External links 
 
 
 
 

1944 films
1944 musical comedy films
1944 romantic comedy films
American black-and-white films
Metro-Goldwyn-Mayer films
World War II films made in wartime
Films directed by Richard Thorpe
Films produced by Joe Pasternak
American musical comedy films
American romantic comedy films
American romantic musical films
1940s romantic musical films